The Dublin Under 21 Football Championship is an annual Gaelic Athletic Association club competition between the under-21 Gaelic footballers of Dublin clubs. The current (2017) under 21 champions of Dublin are Na Fianna who beat Ballyboden St. Enda's 2-11 to 0-9 at O'Toole Park on 9 December 2017.

Under 21 A Championship

Top Winners

2017 Under 21 Football Final

Roll of Honour

Under 21 B Football Championship

Under 21 C Football Championship

Under 21 D Football Championship

Under 21 E Football Championship

References

External links
Official Dublin Website
Dublin on Hoganstand
Dublin Club GAA
Reservoir Dubs
Dublin Teams

Under 21